Bidesk (also Romanized as Bīdesk and Bīdisk; also known as Bīd’īk) is a village in Alqurat Rural District, in the Central District of Birjand County, South Khorasan Province, Iran. At the 2006 census, its population was 238, in 53 families.

References 

Populated places in Birjand County